Washington Fernando Araújo Recarey (born February 23, 1972 in Montevideo) is a former  Uruguayan footballer who is the current manager. He used to play as a defender.

External links
 
 

1972 births
Living people
Footballers from Montevideo
Uruguayan footballers
Rampla Juniors players
El Tanque Sisley players
Uruguayan football managers
Rampla Juniors managers
Association football defenders